Chevaigné (Gallo: Chaevaènyaé) is a commune in the Ille-et-Vilaine department of Brittany in north-western France.

Population
Inhabitants of Chevaigné are called Chevaignéens in French.

See also
Communes of the Ille-et-Vilaine department

References

External links

Official website 
Mayors of Ille-et-Vilaine Association 

Communes of Ille-et-Vilaine